Past:Present:Future is a two-part album series by Ch!pz. In the Netherlands, Part 1 was released on June 23, 2006 and Part 2 was released on November 17 of the same year. The first album spawned two singles, "Gangstertown" and "Waikiki Beach", of which "Gangstertown" peaked at #5 in the Dutch Top 40 and "Waikiki Beach" wasn't officially released on single, just shooting a music video for it. In November 2006, the first album was certified Gold in the Netherlands for sales over 35,000. The second album came with a Bonus DVD in some stores like Free Record Shop and Van Leest. The official first single, "One Day When I Grow Up", was released in September and charted in the Dutch Top 40 at #29, and moved up to #7 in its second, third and fourth week. The second single, the Christmas track "Christmas Time Is Here," debuted at #8 in the Dutch Top 40 and remained there for two weeks.

Part 1

Track listing
"Gangstertown" – 3:13
"Waikiki Beach" – 3:23
"High School Love" – 3:16
"A Little Bit" – 3:14
"Olympia" – 3:33
"Veni Vidi Vici" – 3:13

Singles

Year-end positions

Part 2

Track listing
Disc 1 (CD)
"Studio 54" – 3:28
"One Day When I Grow Up" – 3:17
"Mama" – 3:46
"1929" – 3:29
"Walking on the Moon" – 3:14
"Christmas Time Is Here" – 3:53

Disc 2 (DVD)
"Gangstertown" [Video]
"Waikiki Beach" [Video]
"One Day When I Grow Up" [Video]
The Making Of "Gangstertown" [Video]
Photo Gallery
Photo Gallery

Singles

Year-end positions

EP series
Ch!pz albums
2006 EPs